The Running Man is a 1963 British-American neo noir drama film directed by Carol Reed, starring Laurence Harvey as a man who fakes his own death in a glider accident, then runs into trouble when an insurance investigator starts taking a close interest. It was adapted by screenwriter John Mortimer from the 1961 novel The Ballad of the Running Man by Shelley Smith.

It was filmed in San Roque, Cádiz, La Línea de la Concepción, Cádiz , Algeciras, Cádiz, Spain, Gibraltar and Ireland. The film opened at the Odeon Leicester Square in London's West End on 1 August 1963.

Lee Remick and Alan Bates co-starred with Harvey.

The film briefly came to the attention of the Warren Commission investigating the assassination of President John F. Kennedy because of a viral marketing campaign that placed personal ads in the Dallas Morning News asking the "Running Man" to please call "Lee".  Investigators thought that these might be coded messages placed by assassin Lee Harvey Oswald until they discovered the source of the advertisements.  In Hollywood, an urban legend arose claiming that the film was a flop because it starred actors named Lee and Harvey.

Plot 
Stella Black (Lee Remick) attends a memorial service for her husband Rex. Apparently, he died in a gliding accident, but his body was never recovered. There's a good reason for this; Rex (Laurence Harvey) is still alive. In reality, he and Stella are perpetrating this ruse to collect £50,000 life insurance as revenge against the same company that refused to pay out on a previous claim. Even the insurance company's investigator, Stephen Maddox (Alan Bates), fails to uncover the crime, freeing the Blacks to travel to Malaga for an extended vacation.

While there, Rex steals the passport of drunken Jim Jerome (John Meillon), a touring Australian sheep rancher, and doctors it with his own photograph. This enables Rex to plan a future "trick" involving another insurance company in which, as before, he will fake his own death. Meanwhile, a British male vacationer who Stella recognizes but can't remember approaches her at an outdoor cafe. Eventually, he reminds her that he is Stephen Maddox, the agent who interrogated her after Rex's "funeral". Rex believes Maddox's arrival in Spain is too coincidental, and that he is looking for evidence to expose the Blacks' insurance fraud. In time, though, Stella believes Stephen is only a sweet, lonely man who desires company with someone he had previously met.

Subsequent events bear out Stella's guess; Stephen is guilty of nothing more than looking for companionship with fellow Englanders. But later, Stephen suspects something is amiss with the couple. In fact, Stephen speaks to Rex as if he knows what's going on with their scam without actually saying so. This alarms Rex beyond all reason. At one point, Rex's paranoia fuels his attempt to run Stephen's car off the road as he and Stella make a frenzied getaway drive to Gibraltar. But before the couple can enter British territory, they are detained by a Spanish police captain (Fernando Rey). Rex uses the confusion of a "running-of-the-bulls" event to escape, leaving his wife to the mercies of officialdom. He reaches an air strip, where he steals a private plane and escapes the Rock. The plane runs out of fuel, forcing Rex into the sea, with fatal consequences. The film's final scene, as at the story's beginning, shows Stella, seemingly, mourning the death of Rex—this time, for real, as he is taken away by boat, dead or possibly just unconscious.

Cast
 Laurence Harvey as Rex  
 Lee Remick as Stella 
 Alan Bates as Stephen 
 Felix Aylmer as Parson 
 Eleanor Summerfield as Hilda Tanner 
 Allan Cuthbertson as Jenkins 
 Harold Goldblatt as Tom Webster
 Noel Purcell as Miles Bleeker 
 Ramsay Ames as Madge Penderby 
 Fernando Rey as Police Official 
 Juanjo Menéndez as Roberto (as Juan Jose Menendez)
 Eddie Byrne as Sam Crewdson 
 Colin Gordon as Solicitor
 John Meillon as Jim Jerome 
 Roger Delgado as Spanish Doctor
 Fortunio Bonanova as Spanish Bank Manager
 Shirley Gale as Florence 
 José Calvo as Porter (as Jose Calvo)
 Joe Lynch as Roy Tanner
 Freddy Roberts as Guide
 Adriano Domínguez as Civil Guard (as Adriano Dominguez)
 James Neyland as English Customs Official
 Pamela Pant as Margaret Webster
 Herbert Curiel as 1st Witness
 Antonio Padilla Ruiz as 2nd Witness
 Lockwood West as Bank Manager
 Bob Cummingham as Thomas Guppy
 Ildefonso San Félix as Customs Official (as Ildefonso San Felix)
 María Granada as Dianne (as Maria Granada)
 Rafael Albaicín as Waiter
 Ángel Jiménez as 1st Gispy Boy (as Angel Jimenez)
 Juan Jiménez as 2nd Gispy Boy (as Juan Jimenez)

Original novel
The Ballad of the Running Man was published in 1961. The Guardian called it "horrifying, gripping." The New York Times called it "spellbinding".

Production
In March 1962 it was announced Carol Reed would direct a film based on the novel for Columbia Pictures, who had made Reed's Our Man in Havana. It was the first project Reed worked on since leaving the filming of Mutiny on the Bounty.

Filming took place in Spain, for ten weeks, and at Ardmore Studios in Ireland. The film's sets were designed by the art director John Stoll.

Reception 
The New York Times published a negative review of the film, with critic Bosley Crowther writing: "Mr. Reed, who used to shine at flight and pursuit melodramas, just doesn't put excitement into this film. He has mostly devoted himself to getting the Malaga atmosphere, and this, in color, is rather dazzling. It's the only thing in the film that is."

Writing in The Los Angeles Times, Philip K. Scheuer praised the film, writing: "Columbia's 'The Running Man' is my idea of an almost perfect motion picture — on-edge anxiety, unpredictable surprises, all astonishingly logical; and always a developing sense of characterization, so that — in contrast to the celebrated Mr. Hitchcock's chases — the final bitterly ironic twist leaves one actually moved with pity and a feeling of loss."

Awards
Cinematographer Robert Krasker — one of Carol Reed's favorites — was nominated for the BAFTA colour cinematography award.

See also

 List of British films of 1963
 List of American films of 1963

References

External links
 
 
 
 

1963 films
1963 crime drama films
British aviation films
British crime drama films
Columbia Pictures films
Films about identity theft
Films based on British novels
Films based on crime novels
Films directed by Carol Reed
Films scored by William Alwyn
Films set in Spain
Films set in London
Films shot in Gibraltar
Films shot in Spain
1960s English-language films
1960s British films